Heikki Siren (5 October 1918 in Helsinki – 25 February 2013 in Helsinki) was a Finnish architect. He graduated from the Helsinki University of Technology in 1946 as a student of his father J. S. Sirén. Heikki Siren designed most of his works together with his spouse Kaija Siren.

Famous works
Finnish National Theatre Small Stage, Helsinki, 1954
Otaniemi Chapel, Espoo, 1956
Kallio Municipal Offices, Helsinki, 1965
Ympyrätalo, Helsinki, 1968 
Brucknerhaus, Linz, 1973 
Graniittitalo, Helsinki, 1982
Baghdad Convention Center, Baghdad, 1983

References

Further reading
 Bruun, Erik & Popovits, Sara (eds.): Kaija + Heikki Siren: Architects – Architekten – Architectes. Otava: Helsinki, 1977.

External links

 Museum of Finnish Architecture
 Everything and Nothing: Architects Kaija + Heikki Siren. Espoo City Museum.

1918 births
2013 deaths
Architects from Helsinki
20th-century Finnish architects
Aalto University alumni
Members of the Académie d'architecture